Winner Takes All is a BBC Books original novel written by Jacqueline Rayner and based on the long-running British science fiction television series Doctor Who. It was published on 19 May 2005, alongside The Clockwise Man and The Monsters Inside. It features the Ninth Doctor, Rose Tyler, Jackie Tyler and Mickey Smith.

Plot
On finding that her mum has just won the lottery, Rose decides to visit Earth.

Rose and the Doctor go to visit Mickey, who tells them that everyone is playing Death to Mantodeans, the game that is complementary with the console. Interested, the Doctor starts playing it, while Rose goes out.

The Doctor and Robert are again interrupted by Quevvils calling to find out why the game isn't being played as expected.  The door explodes before they are able to get the controlled Quevvil to respond, so the Doctor has to go back to pretending to play.  He and Robert are taken to another room.  All of the other prisoners are brought into the room as well, and the Doctor is told that one will be killed every time he deviates from the game.

Rose makes it to the center of the game, and the Quevvils get ready to teleport, but the Doctor has Mickey send a signal that disrupts it, which atomizes all the Quevvils. Rose finds that she can move and talk on her own again.

Continuity
Rose tells the Doctor 'You've reversed teleportation before,' a reference to "The End of the World".
Mention is made of Rose being gone for a year, and Mickey being a suspect in her disappearance, a reference to "Aliens of London".
The Doctor's dislike of guns in this book anticipates his comments in "The Doctor Dances" about destroying the weapons factory on Villengard.
One of Mickey's video games is called Bad Wolf.

References to popular culture

When asked by Rose how he knew she was in trouble on her way back from the market, the Doctor replies (with a whole biscuit in his mouth) that his "fpider fenfe waf tingling", a reference to the Marvel Comics superhero Spider-Man and his spider-sense that helps him detect trouble.
When briefing the Doctor and Rose about the new game, Death to Mantodeans, Mickey mentions the PlayStation, the Xbox, Gran Turismo, Resident Evil, TimeSplitters 2, The Blair Witch Project, and Sonic the Hedgehog and Bad Wolf.
A reference to Harry Potter is made when a character daydreams about being a boy whose parents turned out to be great wizards and died fighting an evil sorcerer and is now sent to a special wizarding school to become the great wizard he is destined to be.
The same character makes references to Star Wars in how he daydreams meeting a character who remarks "I am your father," in a cold, deep voice and how it is his destiny to defeat his father (although he interprets it as his mother) in order for good to triumph over evil.
Several references to Charlie and the Chocolate Factory are made by the Doctor and Rose when they are searching for a winning scratch card.
The Doctor jokes that Cookie Monster from Sesame Street is really an alien.
Rose mentions the Thunderbirds.
Robert mentions Bob the Builder.

See also

Whoniverse

External links

The Cloister Library - Winner Takes All

2005 British novels
2005 science fiction novels
Ninth Doctor novels
Novels by Jacqueline Rayner